"Hot Revolver" is a song by American recording artist Lil Wayne, released March 17, 2009, it was intended to be the second single from his seventh studio album, Rebirth (2010). The song, produced by American production duo Cool & Dre, features uncredited guest vocals from Dre. The song was originally intended to be included on Rebirth, however for unspecified reasons it was left off the final track listing. An extended version of the song with an extra verse from Wayne later leaked online on March 26, 2009. A re-recorded version of the song was later included as a bonus track on Wayne's tenth studio album I Am Not a Human Being II (2013), featuring no Auto-Tune and a new verse from Wayne.

Background
Despite speculation that the song featured fellow Cash Money artist Kevin Rudolf, it was confirmed that the featured artist on the song was indeed Dre of production duo Cool & Dre. As the song was not featured on Rebirth, the single cover became the album artwork.

Samples
The song contains a vocal sample from the Green Day song "Basket Case" with the line "Do you have the time to listen to me whine?"
The bass line is also fairly similar to Green Day's song "Whatsername"

Track listing
iTunes Digital download
"Hot Revolver (Main)" — 3:11

Charts

Certifications

Notes

References

2009 singles
Lil Wayne songs
Songs written by Lil Wayne
Cool & Dre songs
Song recordings produced by Cool & Dre
Songs written by Dre (record producer)
2009 songs
Universal Motown Records singles
Cash Money Records singles